Na Tha railway station is a railway station located in Nong Kom Ko Subdistrict, Mueang Nong Khai District, Nong Khai Province.

Na Tha was originally known as Nong Khai, the first railway station for Nong Khai Province until the extension to the new Nong Khai railway station was built and open in July 1958.

The station by the river acted as "Nong Khai" railway station for about 42 years, until the newer and present-day opened in May 2000 as Nong Khai railway station before Nong Khai Mai railway station. The station by the river was renamed to "Talat Nong Khai" and close down 2008.

Train services
 Ordinary No. 415/418 Nakhon Ratchasima–Nong Khai

References 

Railway stations in Thailand
Nong Khai province